Thumbaa is a 2019 Indian Tamil-language adventure film written and directed by Harish Ram L. H. on his directorial debut. The film stars Darshan, newcomer Keerthi Pandian and Dheena. Produced by Surekha Nyapati, the film was distributed by KJR Studios. The film is set against the backdrop of Western Ghats, and mostly consists of VFX and computer graphics. Principal photography began on 27 December 2018, and was completed on 11 April 2019.

The soundtrack of the film features three songs composed by Anirudh Ravichander, Vivek-Mervin, and Santhosh Dhayanidhi, with the latter composing the background music. The cinematography was handled by Naren Elan and edited by R. Kalaivanan. The film was dubbed in Telugu, Malayalam and Hindi and released worldwide on 21 June 2019.

Plot 
Hari (Darshan) and Umapathy (Dheena) come to Top Slip to paint a tiger statue and colorfully design a well-located mountaintop. Then, there is an aspiring young wildlife photographer named Varsha (Keerthi Pandian), who gets special permission to click pictures inside the forest. Meanwhile, Thumbaa, a tiger from Kerala, enters into Top Slip along with its cub. A cunning forest officer denies that the tiger entered his range and sketches a plan to capture it and sell it to buyers. The reason why the forest officer planned to capture Thumbaa is because it does not have the tracker, whereas all other tigers in the forest are being monitored. The rest of the film is all about how Hari, Uma, and Varsha, with the help of local people, save Thumbaa and its cub from the forest officer and his gang.

Cast

Production 
Principal photography began on 27 December 2018. The film is set against the backdrop of Western Ghats and the film is covered with mostly VFX scenes. The filmmakers hired debutante Keerthi Pandian, the daughter of veteran actor and producer Arun Pandian, on her acting debut as the female lead in the film opposite Kanaa-fame Darshan and Dheena who are playing the male lead characters in the film. The film's shooting was wrapped up on 11 April 2019.

Soundtrack 

The film's soundtrack album has three songs, with Anirudh Ravichander, Vivek–Mervin, and Santhosh Dhayanidhi composing one song each. All the songs were released as singles. The first single track "Pudhusattam" composed and sung by Anirudh Ravichander and written by Madhan Karky was released on 8 April 2019. The second single track "Jilebara" sung by Vivek Siva, Mervin Solomon and Jonita Gandhi, written by Ku. Karthik was released on 26 April 2019. The third single track "Humpty Dumpty" which composed by Santhosh Dhayanidhi, penned by Ku. Karthik and sung by Sivakarthikeyan was released on 10 May 2019.

The album met with positive reviews. The Times of India reviewed that "Thumbaa songs play and frolic around you like a refreshing wave. The songs do what many of the new releases haven’t managed to — touch/change your mood. All the three songs are fun and playful, reminding one of childhood days spend running around catching butterflies."

Marketing 
A musical promo video of the film was released on 21 February 2019 in Tamil by actress Keerthy Suresh, Telugu by actor Sai Dharam Tej, Malayalam by Nivin Pauly and Hindi by rapper Badshah. It features composer Anirudh Ravichander and a VFX generated tiger. The promo was unveiled on YouTube and crossed 1.5 million views within 24 hours and gained positive reviews among the audience in the social media.

Release 
The film initially slated to release on 17 May 2019, but its release date pushed to 21 June 2019. The film was dubbed in Telugu, Malayalam and Hindi and released on the same day.

Reception 
Behindwoods.com rated the film 2.75 out of 5 stars and stated, "Thumbaa will entertain your kids and make sure they understand that man must co-exist with wildlife". M. Suganth of The Times Of India gave 3 out of 5 and wrote, "The film might entertain kids, but for the adults who accompany them, it might engage only in parts because of the uneven narration". S. Subhakeerthana of The Indian Express gave 3 out of 5 and said, "An enjoyable children's film that will leave you with a smile". Sify stated, "Thumbaa is a film which will be surely enjoyed by kids but the makers failed to attract all age group audiences mainly because of the weak writing".

References 

2010s adventure films
2010s Tamil-language films
2019 directorial debut films
2019 films
Films scored by Anirudh Ravichander
Indian adventure films